Mohd Farisham bin Ismail (born 5 January 1985) is a Malaysian former professional footballer. He primarily plays as a left-back but can also operate as a centre-back. He is described as an aggressive ball-playing defender.

Born in Tumpat, Kelantan and began his youth career playing for Kelantan President's Cup team in 2003 to 2004. Due to the nature of his leadership, he was appointed as the captain of the team at that time.

Club career
Farisham made his debut with the Kelantan senior team in 2004 before joining the Malacca based club, Telekom Melaka for 2006–07 season. After one season in Malacca he returned to Kelantan and always become the coach first eleven in every match. Farisham and several other defenders formed a persistent defender and tough beat ever since then. Although selected to represent the national team he often only be on the bench and difficult to get main eleven.

In December 2006, Farisham signed with the Malacca based club, Telekom Malaysia for 2006–07 season and help the team finish at 7th in the league.

On 11 July 2016, Farisham joined Penang on a loan deal until the end of 2016 season. The request was made by Penang FA Chief Executive Officer Bojan Hodak, who is a former head coach of the Kelantan. Farisham made his debut on 16 July 2016 in the league match against T–Team as a 76th-minute substitute for defender Rafiuddin Rodin. Penang won that match 3–4. He made 8 appearances with Penang during that season.

International career
Farisham has been called by Football Association of Malaysia to play in the Malaysia national team because he played well during the 2010 Malaysia Cup finals to undergo the national team training center starting 3 August 2011. In September 2013, he was unable to join the Malaysia national team in a friendly match with China due to injury. Farisham made his debut for Malaysia national team in 2–0 friendly win against Myanmar on 18 June 2011.

Career statistics

Club

International

Honours

Club
Kelantan U21
 Malaysia President Cup: Runners-up 2003

Kelantan
 Malaysia Super League: 2011, 2012; Runners-up 2010
 Malaysia Cup: 2010, 2012; Runners-up 2009, 2013
 Malaysia FA Cup: 2012, 2013; Runners-up 2015, 2011, 2009
 Malaysia Charity Shield: 2011; Runners-up 2012

References

External links
 
 

1985 births
Living people
Malaysian footballers
Melaka TM FC players
Kelantan FA players
Penang F.C. players
People from Kelantan
Malaysian people of Malay descent
Association football defenders
Malaysia Super League players
Malaysia international footballers